Theodore Pantechnes was a senior Byzantine official under Manuel I Komnenos and the regency for Alexios II Komnenos (r).

Pantechnes occupied the post of epi ton oikeiakon, head of the main fiscal department of the Byzantine government, continuously from 1148 until 1182. At the same time, he also held a succession of high judicial offices, beginning as koiaistor in 1164, advancing to dikaiodotes by ca. 1166, and finally becoming Eparch of Constantinople in 1182.

References

Sources
 

12th-century Byzantine people
Urban prefects of Constantinople
Officials of Manuel I Komnenos